Class 82 may refer to:

British Rail Class 82, a class of electric locomotives
DB Class 82, a class of German 0-10-0T steam locomotives
KTM Class 82, a class of Malaysian electric multiple units